Sensotronic Brake Control (SBC) is an electro-hydraulic brake system, where the wheel brake cylinders on a vehicle are operated through a servomechanism.  

The SBC system developed by Daimler and Bosch was introduced on the R230 SL-class, which went on sale in Europe in October 2001.

How it works 
In a pure hydraulic brake system, the driver applies force to a pedal by a mechanical link  which then directly applies force to the master brake cylinder.  In turn the master brake cylinder develops hydraulic pressure inside the wheels. 

In contrast, the SBC operates the brakes using brake fluid supply from a hydraulic high-pressure reservoir, which is sufficient for several braking events.

When the driver presses the brake pedal—or when electronic stability control (ESP) intervenes to contrast the vehicle —the SBC control unit will calculate the desired target brake pressures on each individual wheel.  Through the use of independent pressure modulators the system regulates a hydraulic pressure at each wheel.  These four pressure modulators consist of one inlet and one outlet valve, controlled by electronic output stages.

The system employs a travel sensor and a pressure sensor at the pedal to measure the speed and force of the driver's command. The control unit processes this information and generates the control signals for the wheel pressure modulators. Normally, the master brake cylinder is detached from the brake circuit. A pedal travel simulator creates normal pedal feedback. If ESP intervenes, the high-pressure reservoir supplies the required brake pressure quickly and precisely to selected wheels, without any driver involvement.

Advantages and disadvantages 
With fine-grained control of pressure at each wheel, SBC offers a unique platform in which to implement skid protection and traction control compared to cf. Anti-lock braking system (ABS) and Electronic Stability Program (ESP), respectively. Moreover, the system offers innovative functions to reduce the driver's workload. These include Traffic Jam Assist, which brakes the vehicle automatically in stop-and-go traffic once the driver takes his or her foot off the accelerator. The Soft-Stop function - another first - assists with smooth stopping in town traffic.

In case of computer failure, SBC reverts to a hydraulic master cylinder, but driver effort and stopping distance is reported to increase.  In case of pump failure the high-pressure reservoir is capable of retaining enough pressure to stop the vehicle electronically.  Information on other types of failure remain an open question.

Industry recognition 
In 2001 the μ-Club, an association of international experts in the field of brake technology, honored Robert Bosch and Daimler Chrysler for the development of the electrohydraulic brake SBC.

Problems 
In May 2004, Mercedes recalled 680,000 vehicles equipped with the system; in March 2005 a total of 1.3 million vehicles were recalled. In 2006 high-volume models such as the E-class returned to conventional hydraulic brake systems. Low-volume luxury models such as the SL, the Maybach and the SLR continued to use SBC due to the prohibitive cost of redesign.

In a letter - only to US customers - dated August 2018 a warranty addendum was sent extending coverage for 25 years and unlimited miles on the following SBC components.
 Hydraulic control unit
 Hydraulic Pump
 Pressure Reservoir
 Brake Operating Unit
 Front and Rear wheel speed sensors
 Brake lamp switch
 Yaw Rate Sensor

Out of warranty repairs of these items can be reimbursed by MB if proper documentation is provided.

Sensotronic Brake Control applications 
 2003–2006 E-Class (W211)
 SLR
 Maybach
 2003–2006 Mercedes-Benz CLS-Class (W219)
 2001–2011 SL-Class

Other production electro-hydraulic brake systems 
 Toyota Prius (Introduced in 1997; uses an ehb system from Advics)
 Toyota Estima Hybrid (Introduced in 2001 in Japan)
 Ford Escape Hybrid (Introduced in 2003)
 Acura NSX, 2nd generation (Introduced in 2015)
 Audi e-tron (Introduced in 2018)

References 

Vehicle braking technologies